Novica Čanović (Serbian Cyrillic: Новица Чановић; 29 November 1961 – 3 July 1993) was a Serbian high jumper who represented SFR Yugoslavia during his active career.

Biography
Čanović was born in Kumanovo in today's North Macedonia. He finished fifteenth at the 1983 European Indoor Championships and won the gold medal at the 1987 Mediterranean Games. He also competed at the 1984 Olympic Games without reaching the final.

Čanović became Yugoslavian high jump champion in 1982, 1983, 1984, 1986 and 1987, rivalling with Danial Temim, Hrvoje Fižuleto and Sašo Apostolovski. He also became indoor champion in 1987.

He still holds the high jump record in Croatia (senior 228, junior 218 cm and indoor senior 228 cm) as he competed for Croatian AC Slavonija Osijek. His personal best jump was 2.28 metres, achieved in July 1985 in Split.

He died in July 1993 in Knin as a soldier of the Army of the Republic of Serbian Krajina.

References

1961 births
1993 deaths
Sportspeople from Kumanovo
Serbs of North Macedonia
Serbs of Croatia
Yugoslav male high jumpers
Serbian male high jumpers
Athletes (track and field) at the 1984 Summer Olympics
Olympic athletes of Yugoslavia
Mediterranean Games gold medalists for Yugoslavia
Mediterranean Games medalists in athletics
Athletes (track and field) at the 1987 Mediterranean Games
Serbian military personnel killed in action
Military personnel killed in the Croatian War of Independence
Olympians killed in warfare